This is a list of albums, singles, and extended plays by American punk rock musician GG Allin.

Albums

Studio albums

as GG Allin

as GG Allin & The Scumfucs

as GG Allin & The Holy Men

as GG Allin & The Bleeding Cunt Seekers

as GG Allin & Antiseen

as GG Allin & Shrinkwrap

as GG Allin & The Murder Junkies

as GG Allin & The Criminal Quartet

Live albums

as GG Allin

as GG Allin & The Jabbers

as GG Allin & The Texas Nazis

as GG Allin & The Murder Junkies

Compilation albums

as GG Allin

as GG Allin & The Jabbers

Extended plays

as GG Allin

as GG Allin & The Jabbers

as GG Allin & The Scumfucs

as GG Allin & The Cedar St. Sluts

as GG Allin & Bulge

as GG Allin & The Murder Junkies

as GG Allin & The Carolina Shitkickers

Singles

as GG Allin

as GG Allin & The Jabbers

as GG Allin & Antiseen

as GG Allin & The Criminal Quartet

as GG Allin & The Murder Junkies

as GG Allin & The Southern Baptists

Punk rock discographies
Discographies of American artists